Narowal is a tehsil located in Narowal District, Punjab, Pakistan. It is administratively subdivided into 39 Union Councils, four of which form the tehsil capital Narowal.

References

Narowal District
Tehsils of Punjab, Pakistan